The 2004 10,000 Lakes Festival was held July 1 through July 4.

2004 Lineup

The String Cheese Incident     
311                        
The Roots                  
Galactic                   
Medeski Martin & Wood      
Keller Williams            
John Mayer                 
Los Lobos                  
Yonder Mountain String Band
Stockholm Syndrome
North Mississippi Allstars    
Jazz Mandolin Project                
Dirty Dozen Brass Band     
Cyril Neville              
Rob Wasserman              
DJ Logic                   
Soulive                    
Cyro Baptista              
The Radiators              
The Samples                
The Big Wu
Aranka Fabian              
Particle
Buckwheat Zydeco           
Dread Zeppelin             
The Greyhounds             
Maroon 5                   
Xavier Rudd                
New Monsoon                
Donavon Frankenreiter      
The JiMiller Band          
The Lost Trailers          
Wookiefoot                 
Hooch

10,000 Lakes Festival
2004 in American music
2004 music festivals
10000